Lac de Lussy is a lake in the bog at Châtel-Saint-Denis, in the canton of Fribourg, Switzerland. Lake and bog are part of a nature preserve, listed in the Inventory of Mire Landscapes of Particular Beauty and National Importance.

External links
Lac de Lussy - Service de la Nature et du Paysage, canton de Fribourg 

Lakes of Switzerland
Lakes of the canton of Fribourg